Enrique Fernandez Linares (born July 12, 1999), known as Kike Linares, is a professional footballer who plays as a center-back for Thai League 1 Lamphun Warrior. Born in Spain, he represents the Philippines national team.

Club career
Linares was a youth product of Vázquez Cultural and 26 De Febrero.

El Palo
Linares joined Tercera División RFEF club El Palo on a season-long deal. He made his league debut for the club in a 0–1 away win against Atarfe Industrial. In February 2019, Linares scored his first professional goal in a 6–0 home win against Torreperogil.

Montijo
After a season with El Palo, Linares joined Montijo. He made his debut for the club in a 2–1 away defeat against Calamonte.

Bruno's Magpies
In 2020, Linares joined Gibraltar National League club Bruno's Magpies. He made his debut for the club in a 2–3 away win against Lions Gibraltar.

San Pedro
After a short stint in Gibraltar, Linares returned to Spain and joined División de Honor club San Pedro. He made his debut for the club in a 3-0 home win against Rincón. In May 2021, they have won promotion to Tercera División RFEF.

In 2021–22 season, Linares won the Trofeo Antonio Naranjo – an award given to the best player of San Pedro in a certain season.

International career
Linares was born in Spain and is of Filipino descent through a grandmother.

Philippines
In 2019, it was reported that Linares received an invitation to train with the Philippines.

Linares was included in the 25-man squad of the Philippines for 2022 FAS Tri-Nations Series. 

He debuted in a 2–0 friendly loss to Malaysia on 23 March 2022.

Philippines U23
In May 2022, Linares was called-up to represent the Philippines under-23 in the 31st Southeast Asian Games. He made his debut for Philippines U23 in a 4–0 win against Timor-Leste U23.

Personal life
Linares belongs to a family of footballers, he is cousins with Álvaro Silva – who is also a Philippines international, Enrique Silva – brother of Álvaro, who played for Malaga B and Nacho Linares, who currently plays for the U19 team of his former club, Vázquez Cultural.

Honours

Individual
 Trofeo Antonio Naranjo (San Pedro Player of the Year):  2021–22

References

External links
 
 
 

1999 births
Living people
Filipino footballers
Philippines international footballers
Citizens of the Philippines through descent
Spanish footballers
Spanish people of Filipino descent
Filipino people of Spanish descent
Footballers from Cádiz
Association football defenders
Gibraltar National League players
Kike Linares
Kike Linares
Tercera Federación players
Spanish expatriate footballers
Spanish expatriates in Gibraltar
Expatriate footballers in Gibraltar
Competitors at the 2021 Southeast Asian Games
Expatriate footballers in Thailand
Southeast Asian Games competitors for the Philippines